"The Machine Stops" is a science fiction short story (12,300 words) by E. M. Forster. After initial publication in The Oxford and Cambridge Review (November 1909), the story was republished in Forster's The Eternal Moment and Other Stories in 1928. After being voted one of the best novellas up to 1965, it was included that same year in the populist anthology Modern Short Stories. In 1973 it was also included in The Science Fiction Hall of Fame, Volume Two.

The story, set in a world where humanity lives underground and relies on a giant machine to provide its needs, predicted technologies similar to instant messaging and the Internet.

Plot summary
The story describes a world in which most of the human population has lost the ability to live on the surface of the Earth. Each individual now lives in isolation below ground in a standard room, with all bodily and spiritual needs met by the omnipotent, global Machine. Travel is permitted, but is unpopular and rarely necessary. Communication is made via a kind of instant messaging/video conferencing machine with which people conduct their only activity: the sharing of ideas and what passes for knowledge.

The two main characters, Vashti and her son Kuno, live on opposite sides of the world. Vashti is content with her life, which, like most inhabitants of the world, she spends producing and endlessly discussing secondhand 'ideas'. Her son Kuno, however, is a sensualist and a rebel. He persuades a reluctant Vashti to endure the journey (and the resultant unwelcome personal interaction) to his room. There, he tells her of his disenchantment with the sanitised, mechanical world.

He confides to her that he has visited the surface of the Earth without permission and that he saw other humans living outside the world of the Machine. However, the Machine recaptures him, and he is threatened with 'Homelessness': expulsion from the underground environment and presumed death. Vashti, however, dismisses her son's concerns as dangerous madness and returns to her part of the world.

As time passes, and Vashti continues the routine of her daily life, there are two important developments. First, individuals are no longer permitted access to the respirators which are needed to visit the earth's surface. Most welcome this development, as they are sceptical and fearful of first-hand experience and of those who desire it. Secondly, "Technopoly", a kind of religion, is established, in which the Machine is the object of worship. People forget that humans created the Machine, and treat it as a mystical entity whose needs supersede their own.

Those who do not accept the deity of the Machine are viewed as 'unmechanical' and threatened with Homelessness. The Mending Apparatus – the system charged with repairing defects that appear in the Machine proper – has also failed by this time, but concerns about this are dismissed in the context of the supposed omnipotence of the Machine itself.

During this time, Kuno is transferred to a room near Vashti's. He comes to believe that the Machine is breaking down, and tells her cryptically "The Machine stops." Vashti continues with her life, but eventually defects begin to appear in the Machine. At first, humans accept the deteriorations as the whim of the Machine, to which they are now wholly subservient, but the situation continues to deteriorate as the knowledge of how to repair the Machine has been lost.

Finally, the Machine collapses, bringing 'civilisation' down with it. Kuno comes to Vashti's ruined room. Before they both perish, they realise that humanity and its connection to the natural world are what truly matters, and that it will fall to the surface-dwellers who still exist to rebuild the human race and to prevent the mistake of the Machine from being repeated.

Themes
In the preface to his Collected Short Stories (1947), Forster wrote that "'The Machine Stops' is a reaction to one of the earlier heavens of H. G. Wells." In The Time Machine, Wells had pictured the childlike Eloi living the life of leisure of Greek gods whilst the working Morlocks lived underground and kept their whole idyllic existence going. In contrast to Wells' political commentary, Forster points to the technology itself as the ultimate controlling force.

Critical reception
The Fantasy Book Review calls The Machine Stops "dystopic and quite brilliant," noting, "In such a short novel The Machine Stops holds more horror than any number of gothic ghost stories. Everybody should read it, and consider how far we may go ourselves down the road of technological ‘advancement’ and forget what it truly means to be alive;" rating the story as 10 out of 10.

As well as Forster predicting globalisation, the Internet, video conferencing and other aspects of 21st-century reality, Will Gompertz, writing on the BBC website on 30 May 2020, observed, "'The Machine Stops' is not simply prescient; it is a jaw-droppingly, gob-smackingly, breathtakingly accurate literary description of lockdown life in 2020."

In 2021, Wired magazine's Randy Alfred wrote, "__1909: __ E.M. Forster publishes 'The Machine Stops,' a chilling tale of a futuristic information-oriented society that grinds to a bloody halt, literally. Some aspects of the story no longer seem so distant in the future." Alfred went on to note that a lecturer in the story provides, "a chilling premonition of the George W. Bush administration's derogation of 'the reality-based community'".

Adaptations
 A television adaptation, directed by Philip Saville, was shown in the UK on 6 October 1966 as part of the second series of British science-fiction anthology TV series Out of the Unknown. It is one of only four episodes known to exist from the show's second series.
 In 2001, BBC Radio 4 aired Gregory Norminton's adaptation as a radio play.  Another radio adaptation, by Philip Franks, aired on Radio 4 on 19 June 2022.
 Playwright Eric Coble's 2004 stage adaptation was broadcast on 16 November 2007 on WCPN 90.3 FM in Cleveland, Ohio.
 TMS: The Machine Stops is a graphic novel series adaptation written by Michael Lent with art by Marc Rene, published by Alterna Comics in February 2014.
 Playwright Neil Duffield's adaptation was staged at York Theatre Royal in May–June 2016.

Related works
 Mad #1 (Oct–Nov, 1952) featured "Blobs", a seven-page story drawn by Wallace Wood where two inhabitants of 1,000,000 AD discuss the history of man and his evolution into "blobs" totally dependent on the Machine.
 Stephen Baxter's story "Glass Earth Inc.", which refers explicitly to "The Machine Stops", is included in the book Phase Space, published in 2003.
Isaac Asimov's second novel in the I, Robot Series, The Naked Sun (1957), takes place on a planet similar to the earth seen in this story. On the Planet Solaria human colonists live isolated from one another, only viewing each other through holograms, and only have interactions with their robot retinues. After several centuries the humans have become so dependent on this practice it has become taboo to even be in the presence of another human being.   
 The song "The Machine Stops" by the band Level 42 not only shares the same title with the story but also has lyrics that echo Kuno's thoughts.
 The band A Hope for Home based their song, The Machine Stops, on their album Realis on this story by Forster.
 Both George Lucas's film THX 1138 (1971) and the original novel version of Logan's Run (1967) by William F. Nolan and George Clayton Johnson bear similarities to "The Machine Stops".
 The space rock band Hawkwind released a concept album titled  The Machine Stops in 2016 based on the story by Forster.
 Paul Kingsnorth's 2021 essay "Intermission: The Machine Stops" opens with a quote from Forster's novella.

See also 
 1909 in science fiction

References

Further reading
 Seegert, Alf (2010), "Technology and the Fleshly Interface in E. M. Forster's 'The Machine Stops'", Journal of Ecocriticism 2: 1.
 
 Pordzik, Ralph. 2010. Closet fantasies and the future of desire in E. M. Forster's "The Machine Stops". English Literature in Transition 1880–1920 53, No. 1 (Winter): 54–74. 
Wally Wood's version for Mad Magazine, 1952

External links

 
 
The Machine Stops by E. M. Forster (1909) Online text
The Machine Stop and other stories by E. M. Forster, Rod Mengham Online text

Dystopian literature
Plays by Eric Coble
1909 short stories
Religion in science fiction
Short stories by E. M. Forster
Science fiction short stories
Works originally published in British magazines
Works originally published in literary magazines
Constable & Co. books
Fictional computers